Heterosteidae (also known as Heterostiidae) is an extinct family of moderately large to giant, flattened, benthic arthrodire placoderms with distinctive, flattened, triangular skulls that are extremely broad posteriorly, but become very narrow anteriorly.

Heterosteidae belongs to the superfamily Dunkleosteoidea, a relative of the giant Dunkleosteus, as shown in the cladogram below:

Genera
Herasmius Orvig, 1969

Heterosteus Asmuss, 1856

Yinostius J. Wang & N. Wang, 1984

References

Arthrodires
Placoderm families
Early Devonian first appearances
Middle Devonian extinctions